Wilhelm "Willy" Bietak (born 23 May 1947) is an Austrian pair skater and skating event producer. During his career, he competed internationally with partners Evelyne Schneider and Gerlinde Schönbauer, appearing at two Winter Olympics. He was inducted into the World Figure Skating Hall of Fame in 2009.

Personal life 
Bietak was born on 23 May 1947 in Vöcklabruck, Upper Austria. He is the son of Austrian figure skater Ilse Hornung.

Career
With Gerlinde Schönbauer, he represented Austria at the 1964 Winter Olympics, where they placed 12th. Their partnership ended in 1966.

He then teamed up with Evelyne Schneider. They represented Austria at the 1968 Winter Olympics, where they placed 15th.

Following his retirement from competitive skating, he founded Willy Bietak Productions, a production company headquartered in Santa Monica, California. The company produces skating events and temporary ice rinks for events.

He was inducted into the World Figure Skating Hall of Fame in 2009.

Competitive highlights

With Schneider

With Schönbauer

References

External links
 Willy Bietak Productions

Navigation

1947 births
Living people
People from Vöcklabruck
Austrian male pair skaters
Olympic figure skaters of Austria
Figure skaters at the 1964 Winter Olympics
Figure skaters at the 1968 Winter Olympics
Universiade medalists in figure skating
Universiade bronze medalists for Austria
Competitors at the 1970 Winter Universiade
Sportspeople from Upper Austria